Steerage is a lower deck of a ship

Steerage may also refer to:

 Steering#Watercraft steering, the act of steering a ship
The Steerage, an Alfred Stieglitz photograph

See also 

 Steer (disambiguation)
 Steerage Act of 1819